Doña Ines is a volcano in Chile. It is a Miocene age stratovolcano which is formed from lava domes that form its summit area and nuee ardente deposits which form the flanks of the volcano.

Lava domes form the top of the volcano and pyroclastic flow deposits are found on its flanks, generating a noticeable slope contrast between the steeper upper parts of the edifice and the more gentle lower slopes. Additional lava domes can be found on the eastern slopes of the volcano. A subsidiary vent, active at the same time as the main volcano, has formed the Loma Dona Ines rocks south of the main volcano. The Gemelas-Fortuna volcanic centres lie nearby. The basement beneath the volcano on its northern side is formed by Triassic sedimentary and volcanic rocks.

Doña Ines is part of the Maricunga Belt, a volcanic arc at the western edge of the Puna plateau. Volcanic activity within this belt has generated a number of mineral deposits. Doña Ines lies in the northern part of the belt.

The volcano has erupted andesite and dacite, both containing hornblende. The rocks of the summit lava domes contain hornblende, plagioclase and smaller amounts of orthopyroxene. The rocks of Doña Ines have a  content between 56 and 64%. Based on the composition of amphibole, the amphibole crystals formed in magmas with temperatures spanning , with the central vent magmas having higher temperatures at amphibole crystallization and also showing evidence of a more complex magma system.

The stratovolcano was active approximately 15 million years ago, during the Miocene. A date of 15.0 ± 0.3 million years ago has been obtained on one lava flow.

See also 

 Ojos de Maricunga

References

Sources

External links 
 The geochemical evolution of volcan Donna Ines in the central volcanic zone of Chile

Miocene stratovolcanoes
Stratovolcanoes of Chile
Volcanoes of Atacama Region